Omuthiyagwiipundi Constituency is an electoral constituency in the Oshikoto Region of Namibia. It had 21,884 inhabitants in 2004 and 15,220 registered voters . The constituency contains the settlements of Omuthiya and Iipundi. The area is predominantly rural.

Politics
Omuthiyagwiipundi constituency is traditionally a stronghold of the South West Africa People's Organization (SWAPO) party. As in all constituencies in Oshikoto, SWAPO won the 2015 regional election by a landslide. Samuel Panduleni Shivute gained 5,092 votes, while the only opposition candidate Epafras Nghinamundova of the Rally for Democracy and Progress (RDP) gained 239. Councillor Shivute (SWAPO)  was re-elected with 3,759 votes in the 2020 regional election. The only opposition candidate, David Uusiku of the Independent Patriots for Change (IPC), a party formed in August 2020, obtained 2,113 votes.

See also
 Administrative divisions of Namibia

References

Constituencies of Oshikoto Region
States and territories established in 1992
1992 establishments in Namibia